is a former Japanese football player and last play for Japan national team. He is head coach Japan Football League club of Criacao Shinjuku from 2023.

Club career
Kitajima was born in Narashino on May 23, 1978. After graduating from high school, he joined Kashiwa Reysol in 1997. In 1999, he played many matches and the club won J.League Cup. The club also won the 3rd place 1999 and 2000 J1 League. However his opportunity to play decreased, he moved to Shimizu S-Pulse in 2003. He returned to Kashiwa Reysol in 2006. In 2011, the club won the champions 2011 J1 League. He moved to Roasso Kumamoto in June 2012. He retired end of 2013 season.

International career
In October 2000, Kitajima was selected Japan national team for 2000 Asian Cup. At this competition, on October 17, he debuted and scored a goal against Uzbekistan. He played 2 games and Japan won the champions. He played 3 games and scored 1 goal for Japan in 2000.

Managerial career
On 28 November 2022, Kitajima appointment manager of JFL club Criacao Shinjuku for upcoming 2023 season.

Club statistics

1Includes FIFA Club World Cup and Japanese Super Cup.

International statistics

Managerial statistics

Honours
 Kashiwa Reysol
 J.League Cup : 1999
 J2 League : 2010
 J1 League : 2011
 Japanese Super Cup : 2012
 Japan National Team
 AFC Asian Cup : 2000

References

External links

 
 Japan National Football Team Database
 
 
 Kashiwa Reysol Official site
 Hideaki Kitajima Official blog

1978 births
Living people
People from Narashino
Association football people from Chiba Prefecture
Japanese footballers
Japanese football managers
J1 League players
J2 League players
Kashiwa Reysol players
Shimizu S-Pulse players
Roasso Kumamoto players
Japan international footballers
2000 AFC Asian Cup players
AFC Asian Cup-winning players
Association football forwards